Joe Pintauro (November 22, 1930 – May 29, 2018) was an American playwright and author.

Early life
Joe Pintauro was born on November 22, 1930, in Queens, New York. His father, Aniello Pintauro, was a cabinetmaker, and his mother was Carmela (Iovino) Pintauro. He had two older siblings, a brother named Anthony (Tony) who was three years older and a sister named Mildred who was fifteen years older.
He grew up in the Ozone Park neighborhood of Queens.

Pintauro attended John Adams High School in Queens, and he studied at Manhattan College, before transferring to St. Jerome's College in Waterloo, Ontario, where he graduated in 1953 with a degree in philosophy and Latin. After attending Our Lady of Angels Seminary at Niagara University, he was ordained a priest in 1958. While working as a priest Pintauro attended Fordham University to work on a master's degree in American Literature.

In 1966 Pintauro left the priesthood, finding work as a copy writer and a poet.

Career

Pintauro's first published work was To Believe in God, a book of poetry released in 1968. His first novel, Cold Hands, was published in 1979.

Pintauro become known as a playwright whose works often covered the AIDS crisis. His first play, Snow Orchid, was staged in 1982 by the Circle Repertory Company Other plays by Pintauro include Beside Herself (1989), The Dead Boy (1990), Raft of the Medusa (1991), and Men's Lives (1992).

In 1995 Pintauro wrote the short play Dawn as part of a production, commissioned by the Bay Street Theater in Sag Harbor, of three short beach plays featuring work by playwrights Lanford Wilson and Terrence McNally entitled By the Sea, By the Sea, by the Beautiful Sea.

Pintauro taught playwriting at Southampton College, he taught fiction writing at Sarah Lawrence College and at New York University Tisch School of the Arts, and he taught filmmaking at Marymount Manhattan College and at the School of Visual Arts.

In 2018 Pintauro bequeathed his literary archives to the John Jermain Memorial Library.

Publications

Drama
Snow Orchid, produced by the Circle Repertory Company in New York, NY, in 1982.
Beside Herself, produced by the Circle Repertory Company in New York, NY, in 1989.
The Dead Boy, 1990.
Raft of the Medusa, produced by the Minetta Lane Theater in New York, NY, in 1991.
"Dawn", By the Sea, By the Sea, By the Beautiful Sea, produced by the Bay Street Theatre in Sag Harbor, NY, in 1995.
What I Did For Love, produced at Guild Hall in East Hampton, NY, in 2002.
Cathedral, produced by the Manhattan Theater Source in New York, NY, in 2009.

Poetry
To Believe in God, Harper and Row (New York, NY), 1968
To Believe in Man, Harper and Row (New York, NY), 1970
To Believe in Things, Harper and Row (New York, NY) 1971
One Circus, Three Rings, Forever and Ever, Hooray!, Harper and Row (New York, NY), 1969.
Kites at Empty Airports, Harper and Row (New York, NY), 1972.
The Earth Mass, Harper and Row (New York, NY), 1973.

Novels
Cold Hands, Simon and Schuster (New York, NY), 1979.
State of Grace, Times Books (New York, NY), 1983.
The River of Heaven. Unpublished (Sag Harbor, NY), 2018.

Personal life 
Pintauro and his partner of 40 years, Greg Therriault, married in 2013.

Pintauro died in Sag Harbor, New York on May 29, 2018, at the age of 87, of complications from metastatic prostate cancer.

References

External links
Personal website

1930 births
Writers from Queens, New York
2018 deaths
20th-century American dramatists and playwrights
American gay writers
American LGBT novelists
American male novelists